Chocotto Sister is an anime television series produced by Nomad and directed by Yasuhiro Kuroda, with music by Masara Nishida and character designs by Yukihiro Kitano. The opening theme is "Doki! Doki! My Sister Soul" by Harenchi Punch and the ending theme is "Neko-nyan Dance" by Harenchi Punch. The 24 episodes were broadcast between 12 July 2006 and 20 December 2006 on Kids Station. It was later released on eight DVDs.

Episode list

References 

Chocotto Sister